The following elections occurred in the year 1874.

 1874 Argentine presidential election
 1874 German federal election
 1874 Newfoundland general election

North America

Canada
 1874 Canadian federal election
 1874 Manitoba general election
 1874 New Brunswick general election
 1874 Newfoundland general election
 1874 Nova Scotia general election

United States
 United States House of Representatives elections in California, 1874
 Election Riot of 1874
 1874 New York state election
 United States House of Representatives elections in South Carolina, 1874
 1874 South Carolina gubernatorial election
 1874 and 1875 United States House of Representatives elections
 1874 and 1875 United States Senate elections

Europe

United Kingdom
 1874 United Kingdom general election
 1874 United Kingdom general election in Ireland

South America

Argentina 
 1874 Argentine presidential election

See also
 :Category:1874 elections

1874
Elections